Killing Machine is the fifth studio album by English heavy metal band Judas Priest, released on 9 October 1978 by Columbia Records. The album pushed the band towards a more commercial style while still featuring the dark lyrical themes of their previous albums. At about the same time, the band members adopted their now-famous "leather-and-studs" fashion image, inspired by Rob Halford's interest in
leather culture. It is the band's last studio album to feature drummer Les Binks. In the United States, it was released with a different title as Hell Bent for Leather due to controversy over the Cleveland Elementary School shooting.

International and American versions
The album was retitled Hell Bent for Leather for its US release in early 1979, because the US branch of Columbia did not like the "murderous implications" of the title.  Both album titles are drawn from the titles of songs on the album with "The Green Manalishi (With the Two Prong Crown)", an early Fleetwood Mac cover, being added to the US release.

The album was also pressed in red vinyl in the UK.

Overview
With Killing Machine, Judas Priest began moving to a more accessible, commercial format that abandoned the complex, fantasy-themed songs of their previous three albums. While this album still had dark undertones, it was more grounded in realism. This was reflected in their change of stage costumes from flowing Gothic robes to leather, but was also a reaction to the rising punk and new wave movements. K. K. Downing had expressed doubts about the new wave of British heavy metal stating "everybody was totally dedicated to having their own show, their own images". Priest were part of the influence on the NWOBHM, but not part of it. The band's new, simpler sound was the result of several factors, including a desire to compete with punk rock, produce songs that were easier to perform live, and also appeal more to American audiences. Tracks such as "Burnin' Up" and "Evil Fantasies" are replete with S&M themes while "Running Wild" is about late-night partying and "Before the Dawn" a depressing ballad. "Hell Bent for Leather" reflected their newly adopted leather costumes as well as Rob Halford's soon-to-be-trademark entrances on stage in a Harley-Davidson motorcycle.

The single "Take on the World" was an attempt at producing a stadium shoutalong tune in the mould of Queen's "We Will Rock You", and was also covered by new wave band The Human League on their 1980 tour. The lyrics were simplified a bit from the band's previous albums and adapted more into mainstream arena rock, but the instruments retained their characteristic aggressiveness with heavier guitar riffing and elements of blues influence returned on some songs. The album is certified gold by the RIAA. 

"Hell Bent For Leather", and "The Green Manalishi" were the two songs from Killing Machine which became standard parts of the band's live setlist, with the other songs being performed rarely ("Evil Fantasies", "Running Wild", "Rock Forever and "Take On the World") or not at all. "Running Wild" and "Delivering The Goods" became regulars on the Firepower tour setlists in 2018 after not being played since 1980, and the title track returned to the band's setlists at a show in Paris in January 2019 after being absent for 40 years.

Reissues
The album was remastered in 2001, with two bonus tracks added (three in the UK). The bonus track "Fight for Your Life" was the "original" version of Judas Priest's "Rock Hard Ride Free" from their Defenders of the Faith album. "The Green Manalishi (With the Two-Pronged Crown)" is considered a bonus track on the UK remaster, but a regular track on the U.S. version.

In 2010, audiophile label Audio Fidelity released a limited-edition 24-karat gold CD of Hell Bent for Leather. Mastering was done by Steve Hoffman. This does not contain the bonus tracks from the 2001 edition.

Recording and production
This is the first Judas Priest album where Glenn Tipton incorporated the guitar technique of tapping into his soloing style,  which had been popularized by Eddie Van Halen earlier that year with the release of Van Halen's popular debut album. This can be heard in the solos of "Hell Bent for Leather" and "Killing Machine".

This is also the final studio album for drummer Les Binks who had joined the band in early 1977 in time for the Sin After Sin tour; he is credited with helping develop the traditional Priest percussive sound. Binks was dropped and replaced by drummer Dave Holland after the 1979 tour because of a financial disagreement where the band's manager Mike Dolan wanted Binks to "waive his fees" for performing on the platinum selling 1979 Unleashed in the East live album.

Critical reception

In 2005, Killing Machine was ranked number 321 in Rock Hard magazine's book The 500 Greatest Rock & Metal Albums of All Time. This album, as well as subsequent albums by the band, have somewhat divided fans, with some preferring the complexity and darkness of the early albums, while others prefer the more mainstream and polished later albums.

In popular culture
The song "Hell Bent for Leather" is featured in Ari Gold's 2008 film Adventures of Power, the 2004 episode of the sitcom That '70s Show entitled "Surprise, Surprise" and also featured in 2009 game Guitar Hero: Metallica.

Track listing

Personnel
Judas Priest
 Rob Halford – vocals
 K. K. Downing – guitars
 Glenn Tipton – guitars, keyboards on "Before the Dawn"
 Ian Hill – bass except "Take on the World"
 Les Binks – drums

Additional Musician
Dave Holland – drums (Tracks 12-13)

Production
 Produced by James Guthrie and Judas Priest
 Engineered by James Guthrie, assisted by Damian Korner, Andrew Jackson, Kevin Dallimore, and Andrew Clark
 Cover design by Rosław Szaybo
 Photography by Bob Elsdale

Charts

Certifications

References

1978 albums
Albums produced by James Guthrie (record producer)
Columbia Records albums
Judas Priest albums